Ocean Park is a resort (balneario) in the Maldonado Department of Uruguay.

Geography
It borders the resort Sauce de Portezuelo to the west and to the resort Chihuahua to the east, with the creek Arroyo del Potrero separating it with the latter. Its northern limit is the Ruta Interbalnearia, also marked as Route 93 for this area, and across from it are the towns La Capuera, El Pejerrey and the Capitán de Corbeta Carlos A. Curbelo International Airport, on the shore of the Laguna del Sauce.

Population
In 2011 Ocean Park had a population of 234 permanent inhabitants and 280 dwellings.
 
Source: Instituto Nacional de Estadística de Uruguay

References

External links
INE map of Sauce de Portezuelo, Ocean Park, Chihuahua and La Capuera

Populated places in the Maldonado Department
Seaside resorts in Uruguay